The Mattstetten–Rothrist new line (Neubaustrecke Mattstetten-Rothrist) is Switzerland's first railway to reach speeds above 160 km/h (100mph) in regular operations, running between Mattstetten and Rothrist.  It forms most of the Olten–Bern railway line, which makes up over half of the trunk route connecting Switzerland's main city, Zürich and its capital, Bern. The new line opened on 12 December 2007, as the centrepiece of the Rail 2000 project, a comprehensive upgrade of Swiss railways.

At Wanzwil junction, a  upgraded former local line to Solothurn connects to the rest of the Jura foot railway line (to Biel/Bienne, Neuchâtel, Yverdon and Geneva). The line was the longest new line built in Switzerland since 1926. Construction began in April 1996  and the last piece of rail was put into place on 30 April 2004 at the Bern-Solothurn canton border at Inkwil on the connection to Solothurn.

The Mattstetten–Rothrist was the first in Switzerland to put the European Train Control System (ETCS) into regular operation. This was originally planned for December 2004 but had to be repeatedly postponed because of technical problems. The ETCS trackside equipment consists of a Radio Block Center, the required balises and an electronic interlocking.

References

Railway lines in Switzerland
High-speed railway lines in Switzerland
Railway lines opened in 2007
2007 establishments in Switzerland
Swiss Federal Railways lines